John Clare is an American soccer coach.  He played professionally in the American Professional Soccer League and National Professional Soccer League.

Clare, the father of Matt Clare, attended the College of Boca Raton, playing on the men's soccer team from 1986 to 1988.  In 1989, Clare turned professional with the Fort Lauderdale Strikers of the American Soccer League.  At the end of the ASL season, Clare moved to Germany where he trained, but played no league matches, with the Werder Bremen reserve team.  He was back with the Strikers in 1990 as the team played in the American Professional Soccer League which was formed by the merger of the American Soccer League and Western Soccer League that year.  Clare remained with the Strikers through the 1993 season.  In 1990, he also signed with the Canton Invaders of the National Professional Soccer League.  He spent two seasons with Canton.  Clare also played for the Charlotte Eagles of the USISL twice, the first time in 1997 and the second in 1999.

Clare coaches with Players Club of Tampa Bay in Brandon, Florida.

References

Living people
American soccer players
American soccer coaches
American Soccer League (1988–89) players
American Professional Soccer League players
Canton Invaders players
Charlotte Eagles players
Fort Lauderdale Strikers (1988–1994) players
Lynn Fighting Knights men's soccer players
National Professional Soccer League (1984–2001) players
USISL players
Association football defenders
Year of birth missing (living people)